Şehrîbana Kurdî (or Shahribana Kurdi), (born 1973), is a Kurdish singer. She was born in İzmir in western Turkey. Her family are originally from Kiziltepe, Mardin. She began singing at the age of 14 in 1987 at local school bands, and since 1991 she has become a professional singer. Her first album was titled Ez keçim keça Kurdanim (I am a Kurdish girl).

Albums
 Ez keçim keça Kurdanim, (I am a Kurdish girl), 1991.
 Sor Gula Min, 1992.
 Yek, du, sê, (One, two, three), 1993.
 Em Hatin, (We came), 1995.
 Evîna Stranan, (Love of songs), 2005.

References

External links
  

1973 births
Musicians from İzmir
Turkish-language singers
Kurdish-language singers
Kurdish musicians
Turkish people of Kurdish descent
Living people
Date of birth missing (living people)